The Blaise is an  long river in the Haute-Marne and Marne departments in northeastern France. Its source is in the village of Gillancourt. It flows generally northwest. It is a left tributary of the Marne into which it flows at Arrigny.

Departments and communes along its course
This list is ordered from source to mouth: 
Haute-Marne: Gillancourt, Blaisy, Juzennecourt, Lachapelle-en-Blaisy, Lamothe-en-Blaisy, Colombey-les-Deux-Églises, Curmont, Guindrecourt-sur-Blaise, Daillancourt, Bouzancourt, Cirey-sur-Blaise, Arnancourt, Doulevant-le-Château, Dommartin-le-Saint-Père, Courcelles-sur-Blaise, Dommartin-le-Franc, Ville-en-Blaisois, Doulevant-le-Petit, Rachecourt-Suzémont, Vaux-sur-Blaise, Montreuil-sur-Blaise, Brousseval, Wassy, Attancourt, Louvemont, Allichamps, Humbécourt, Éclaron-Braucourt-Sainte-Livière
Marne: Landricourt, Sainte-Marie-du-Lac-Nuisement, Hauteville, Écollemont, Arrigny

References

Rivers of France
Rivers of Marne (department)
Rivers of Haute-Marne
Rivers of Grand Est